Dato' Mustapha Azahari bin Maarof (Jawi: مصطفى ازاهاري معروف; 1 January 1935 – 15 December 2014) was a Malaysian actor. He appeared in Singapore’s Hang Tuah (1959), 1957: Hati Malaya (2007) and Chermin (2007), among many other films. Maarof won the Veterans' Award presented at the 10th Malaysian Film Festival. He served on the board of National Film Development Corporation Malaysia, from which he received the Industry Icon Award in 2010. Maarof co-founded the charity arm of Persatuan Seniman Malaysia, a Malaysian artists' collective.

Personal life
He was the son of Maarof Zakaria, lawyer and founder of Malay National Bank (Bank Kebangsaan Melayu). He was married twice, first to Suraya Harun from 1962–1965 and secondly to Rosnah Jasni, also known as Roseyatimah, from 1967 until her death on 14 December 1987.

Maarof died in December 15, 2014 at Wangsa Maju, Kuala Lumpur from respiratory failure at the age of 79, just before his 80th birthday on January 1, 2015.

Filmography

Film

Television series

Honours

Honours of Malaysia 
  :
 Member of the Order of the Defender of the Realm (AMN) (1992)
 Officer of the Order of the Defender of the Realm (KMN) (2003)
  :
  Knight Companion of the Order of Sultan Ahmad Shah of Pahang (DSAP) – Dato' (2010)
  :
  Knight Commander of the Grand Order of Tuanku Jaafar (DPTJ) – Dato' (2003)

References

External links

1935 births
2014 deaths
20th-century Malaysian male actors
People from Negeri Sembilan
Respiratory disease deaths in Malaysia
Deaths from respiratory failure
Malaysian male film actors
Malay Film Productions contract players
Pesona Pictures contract players